B. tinctoria may refer to:

 Baptisia tinctoria, a plant species
 Bergeris tinctoria, a plant species in the genus Bergeris found in India
 Broussonitia tinctoria, a plant species in the genus Broussonitia

See also
 Tinctoria